= Baku Business University =

University in Baku, Azerbaijan

- Type: Private
- Established: 1993
- Rector: Ibad Abbasov
- Academic staff: 126
- Students: 2494
- Location: Baku, Azerbaijan; 40°23′49.6″N 49°48′24.5″E
- Campus: Urban
- Website: {bbu.edu.az
- Location in Baku, Azerbaijan Baku Business University (Azerbaijan) Baku Business University (Caucasus Mountains)

Baku Business University, established in 1993, is a private higher education institution located in Baku, Azerbaijan.

== History ==
Baku Business University (BBU) was established in 1993. It was officially registered under Decision No. 7/3 dated March 13, 1993, by the State Higher Expert Commission under the Ministry of Education of the Republic of Azerbaijan and initially operated with the status of an institute.

== Education ==
Baku Business University offers undergraduate and graduate programs across 18 specializations, managed by two faculties and eight departments. The university aims to prepare professionals in economics, management, and business fields, with a faculty of 126 academic staff members.

The academic curriculum is designed to foster the personal and professional development of students, with core courses comprising 80% of the training schedule. Practical training and research internships are conducted at partner institutions and laboratories, utilizing interactive methods aligned with international standards.

The university provides education at both bachelor's and master's levels, with options for full-time and part-time study. As of recent data, the institution enrolls 2,310 full-time and 184 part-time students.

=== Campus ===
Baku Business University is located in the Yasamal district of Baku, between the 20 Yanvar and İnşaatçılar metro stations. The campus includes various facilities, such as a walking garden, a science park, a square, a sports stadium, and recreational areas.

=== Library ===
The university library houses a wide range of books, periodicals, audiovisual materials, and digital resources to support the academic and research needs of students and faculty.

=== Dining ===
The university has three cafeterias that serve the needs of students and staff.

=== Recreation ===
The campus features recreational facilities, including a square, a stadium, playgrounds, and green spaces designed for relaxation and leisure.

== Faculties ==
=== School of Business and Management ===
- Management
- Marketing
- Economics
- International Trade and Logistics
- Industrial Organization and Management
- Business Administration
- State and Municipal Management
- Information Technology
- Translation (English)
- Social Work (full-time and part-time)

=== School of Economy and Management ===
- Finance
- Accounting
- World Economy
- Translation (English)
- Social Work
